Nijaat  (English: Liberation) is an eighteen-episode Pakistani television drama serial produced by PTV. The drama shows the different roles of women in Pakistan. It compares the women in the village to the urban women. It emphasizes  family planning, child labor and community health reforms.
After many years PTV Home Reshowned it From 16 May 2020, Daily at 12.00 P.M in PTV Gold Hour.

Plot
This drama is based on the interwinding stories of three families in a village in Sindh, Pakistan: Zareena, a health worker, and her family; Sajida and Huzoor Bakhsh, who have so many children that Sajida has very poor health; and Ali Asad, a local government worker (Assistant Commissioner), and his wife Tania. The drama follows their hopes and frustrations as they strive for a better future while trying not to sacrifice the past.

Cast and Characters

Music 
The background score is composed by Arshad Mehmood. The drama features the following songs:

Social Impact 

A study was undertaken to evaluate the social impact of this drama on contract to Johns Hopkins University/Population Communication Services (JHU/PCS) by Aftab Associates (Pvt.) Ltd., Lahore, Pakistan. The support for this study was provided by International Development Research Center (IDRC), Canada. The usefulness of findings from qualitative evaluations of 'Nijaat' (and Alang-Alang in Indonesia) has led to further collaborations between JHU/PCS and filmmakers. The screenplay was written by renowned playwright Asghar Nadeem Syed.

References

External links
 https://www.youtube.com/watch?v=cfufUnNblRs, Watch complete PTV Drama Serial 'Nijaat' on YouTube, Retrieved 26 October 2016

Pakistani drama television series
Urdu-language television shows
Pakistan Television Corporation original programming
Television shows set in Karachi